= Lenis longiabdominis =

Scientific classification
- Kingdom: Animalia
- Phylum: Arthropoda
- Subphylum: Chelicerata
- Class: Arachnida
- Order: Araneae
- Infraorder: Araneomorphae
- Family: Linyphiidae
- Genus: Lenis; Irfan, Zhang & Peng, 2025
- Species: L. longiabdominis

Binomial name
- Lenis longiabdominis Irfan, Zhang & Peng, 2025

Species of spider

Lenis is a monotypic genus of spiders in the family Linyphiidae containing the single species, Lenis longiabdominis.

== Distribution ==
Lenis longiabdominis is endemic to China.
